Raymond Stanley Tenorio (born February 8, 1965) is an American-Guamanian politician and former police officer of the Guam Police Department who served as the 9th Lieutenant Governor of Guam from January 3, 2011, to January 7, 2019. Tenorio is a Republican and served as a Senator in the Legislature of Guam from January 6, 2003, until January 3, 2011. He unsuccessfully ran for Governor of Guam, losing to Democrat Lou Leon Guerrero in the 2018 gubernatorial election.

Early life and education
Tenorio was born on February 8, 1965, in Orlando, Florida. He was raised in Orlando by his birth father until he was sent to live in a foster home. His mother, then Helen V. Eubank (1944–2016), located him at a foster home in Tennessee. She married Romeo Mantanona Tenorio (1943–2000) and brought Ray with her to Guam when he was approximately ten years old.

Tenorio graduated from George Washington High School on Guam in 1983. He earned a Criminal Justice Academy certificate from Guam Community College in 1984. Tenorio received a bachelor's degree in public administration from the University of Guam in 2000 and a master's degree, also in public administration, from the University of Guam in July 2011.

Career
Tenorio served as a police officer in the Guam Police Department for fourteen years. He has also worked as the president of Trace Investigation Inc. and Denanche Security Agency.

Guam Legislature 
Tenorio was first elected to be Senator in the Guam Legislature in the November 2002 election. He garnered the highest votes in both 2002 and 2004 elections. Tenorio first swore an oath as Senator in January 2003 to become a member of the 27th Guam Legislature and served four consecutive terms, including the 28th, 29th and 30th Guam Legislatures, before becoming Lt. Governor in 2011.

Lt. Governor of Guam
Republican gubernatorial candidate and Minority Leader Eddie Calvo chose Tenorio as his running mate for Lieutenant Governor of Guam in the 2010 gubernatorial election. Calvo and Tenorio defeated their Republican opponents, Lt. Governor Michael Cruz and running mate James Espaldon, in the Republican primary election on September 3, 2010. 
The Republican ticket of Eddie Calvo and Ray Tenorio narrowly won the 2010 Guam gubernatorial election by approximately 500 votes over the Democratic ticket of former Governor Carl Gutierrez and Frank Aguon. Calvo and Tenorio were sworn into office on January 3, 2011, at the Plaza de España in Hagåtña. Their opponents, Gutierrez and Aguon, filed an unsuccessful lawsuit challenging the results and asking the courts to order a new gubernatorial election.

2018 gubernatorial candidacy

In January 2018, incumbent Lt. Governor Ray Tenorio officially announced his candidacy to be the next Governor of Guam. Tenorio selected former senator V. Anthony "Tony" Ada to be his running mate for the upcoming Republican primaries. The Tenorio/Ada ticket ran unopposed for the Republican primary but lost the general election to Democrat Lou Leon Guerrero.

Personal life 
Tenorio is married to Madoka Hosotani Tenorio and they reside in Yigo, Guam. He has five children - LaDonna, Nicole, Raymond Jr., Rome Scott and Richard. He also has many grandchildren. Tenorio was an avid World of Warcraft player.

Legislative history

30th Guam Legislature Jan. 2009-Jan. 2011 
Assistant Minority Leader
Vice Chairman, Committee on Public Safety, Law Enforcement & Senior Citizens
Member, Committee on Education
Member, Committee on Tourism, Cultural Affairs, Public Broadcasting and Youth
Member, Committee on Municipal Affairs, Aviation, Housing & Recreation
Member, Committee on the Guam Military Buildup and Homeland Security
Member, Committee on Utilities, Transportation, Public Works & Veterans Affairs
Member, Committee on Labor, Public Structure, Public Libraries & Technology
Member, Committee on Economic Development, Health & Human Services and Judiciary

29th Guam Legislature Jan. 2007-Jan. 2009 
Acting Speaker
Vice Speaker
Legislative Secretary
Chairman, Committee on Criminal Justice, Public Safety and Youth
Member, Executive Committee
Member, Committee on Aviation, Federal Affairs, Labor, Housing, Banking and Insurance
Member, Committee on Tourism, Maritime, Military, Veterans and Foreign Affairs
Member, Committee on Education, General & Omnibus Affairs
Member, Committee on Finance, Taxation, Commerce & Economic Development

28th Guam Legislature Jan. 2005-Jan. 2007 
Majority Leader
Chairman, Committee on Criminal Justice, Public Safety and Youth & Foreign Affairs
Vice Chairman, Committee on Education & Community Development
Member, Committee on Finance, Taxation & Commerce
Member, Committee on Health & Human Services
Member, Committee on Natural Resources, Utilities & Micronesian Affairs
Member, Committee on Aviation, Immigration, Labor & Housing
Member, Committee on Judiciary, Governmental Operations & Reorganization
Member, Committee on General and Omnibus Matters

27th Guam Legislature Jan. 2003-Jan. 2005 
Minority Whip
Member, Committee on Utilities & Land
Member, Committee on Health
Member, Subcommittee on Restoration of the Guam Legislature Building
President, Trace Investigations, Inc., 1997–2002
President, Denanche Security Agency, 1995–2002
Police Officer, Guam Police Department, 1984–1997

References

External links

|-

|-

1965 births
21st-century American politicians
Guamanian police officers
Guamanian Republicans
Lieutenant Governors of Guam
Living people
Members of the Legislature of Guam
People from Orlando, Florida
University of Guam alumni